This is a list of successful candidates from constituencies in Bihar in the 1977 general elections to the 5th Lok Sabha, the lower house of the parliament of India.

National parties
 BJS Bharatiya Jana Sangh
 CPI Communist Party of India
 CPM Communist Party of India (Marxist)
 INC Indian National Congress
 NCO Indian National Congress (Organisation)
 PSP Praja Socialist Party
 SSP Samyukta Socialist Party
 SWA Swatantra Party

List of successful candidates
Bihar
 Bagaha (SC) Bhola Raut INC
 Motihari Bibhuti Mishra INC
 Bettiah Kamal Nath Tiwari INC
 Gopalganj Dwarika Nath Tiwary INC
 Siwan Mohamad Yusuf INC
 Chapra Ram Shekhar Prasad Singh INC
 Maharajganj Ramdeo Singh SSP
 Kesaria Kamla Mishra Madhukar CPI
 Hajipur Digvijay Narain Singh NCO
 Muzaffarpur Nawal Kishore Sinha INC
 Sitamarhi Shyam Sunder Das PSP
 Pupri Hari Kishore Singh INC
 Jainagar Bhogendra Jha CPI
 Madhubani Jagannath Mishra INC
 Samastipur Yamuna Prasad Mandal INC
 Darbhanga Vinoda Nand Jha INC
 Rosera (SC) Ram Bhagat Paswan INC
 Saharsa Chiranjib Jha INC
 Madhipura Rajendra Prasad Yadav INC
 Araria (SC) Tul Mohan Ram INC
 Kishanganj Jamilur Rahman INC
 Purnea Mohammad Tahir INC
 Katihar Gyaneshwar Prasad Yadav BJS
 Rajmahal (St) Iswar Marandi INC
 Bodda Jagdish N#Mandal INC
 Dumka (St) Satya Charan Besra INC
 Banka Shiv Chandika Prasad INC
 Bhagalpur Bhagwat Jha Azad INC
 Monghyr Deonandan Prasad Yadav INC
 Jamui (SC) Bhola Manjhi CPI
 Khagaria Shivshankar Prasad Yadav SSP
 Begusarai Shyamnandan Mishra NCO
 Nalanda Sedheshwar Prasad INC
 Barh Dharamvir Singh INC
 Patna Ramavatar Shastri CPI
 Shahabad Bali Ram Bhagat INC
 Buxar Anant Prasad Sharma INC
 Bikramganj Sheo Pujan Singh INC
 Sasaram (SC) Jag Jiwan Ram INC
 Aurangabad Satyendra Narayan Sinha NCO
 Jehanabad Chandra Shekhar Sinha CPI
 Nawada Sukhdeo Prasad Verma INC
 Gaya (SC) Ishwar Choudhary BJS
 Chatra Shankar Dyal Singh INC
 Giridih Chapalendu Bhattacharyya INC
 Dhanbad Ram Narain Sharma INC
 Hazaribagh Damodar Pandey INC
 Ranchi Prashant Kumar Ghosh INC
 Jamshedpur Sardar Swaran Singh INC
 Singhbhum (St) Moran Singh Purty Jkp
 Khunti (St) Nirel Enem Horo Ind
 Lohardaga (St) Kartik Oraon INC
 Palamau (SC) Kamla Kumari INC

References

External links
 
 

1977 Indian general election
Indian general elections in Bihar
1970s in Bihar